Dhanishka is an Indian origin name that has a similar meaning to Tanishka, which refers to Goddess of Gold. The gender of the name is female.

Indian feminine given names
Hindu given names
Sanskrit-language names
Telugu given names